An election to Oxfordshire County Council took place on 4 June 2009 as part of the 2009 United Kingdom local elections, having been delayed from 7 May, to coincide with elections to the European Parliament. 74 councillors were elected from various electoral divisions, which returned either one, two or three county councillors each by first-past-the-post voting for a four-year term of office. The electoral divisions were the same as those used at the previous election in 2005.

All locally registered electors (British, Irish, Commonwealth and European Union citizens) who were aged 18 or over on Thursday 4 June 2009 were entitled to vote in the local elections. Those who were temporarily away from their ordinary address (for example, away working, on holiday, in student accommodation or in hospital) were also entitled to vote in the local elections, although those who had moved abroad and registered as overseas electors cannot vote in the local elections. It is possible to register to vote at more than one address (such as a university student who had a term-time address and lives at home during holidays) at the discretion of the local Electoral Register Office, but it remains an offence to vote more than once in the same local government election.

Summary
The election saw the Conservative Party increase their majority on the council by an extra 8 seats, the party won two thirds of the seats in the council. The Liberal Democrats remained the councils official opposition despite losing 5 seats. Labour gained a seat and the Greens lost 3 seats, reducing their representation down to 2 councillors. One Independent lost his seat, the other was re-elected.

Results

|}

References

2009 English local elections
2009
2000s in Oxfordshire